The Trofeo San Nicola is a yearly football friendly tournament played by three Italian football teams. The trophy is played in an unusual format where each team plays a traditional half of football against the other two teams, each half of which comprises a separate match.

Winners

Editions

2015 Trofeo San Nicola

Standings
Only one 45-minute half played.
3 points for win, 0 points for loss
2 points for penalty shoot-out win, 1 point for penalty shoot-out loss.
 Milan won the tournament.

Scorers

Matches

References

Italian football friendly trophies
Recurring sporting events established in 2015
2015 establishments in Italy